Elmer Dessens Jusaino [deh-SENZ] (born January 13, 1971) is a  Mexican former professional baseball pitcher in Major League Baseball (MLB).

Personal life
Elmer Dessens was born on January 13, 1971, in Hermosillo, Mexico. At age 10, he worked as a newspaper boy. Dessens graduated from Carrera Technical High School.  He is married to Lorenia and has three sons, Elmer Jr., Erick, Edward Dessens enjoys fishing and is a Los Angeles Lakers fan.

Baseball career

Pittsburgh Pirates

Yomiuri Giants
He pitched that season for the Yomiuri Giants of the Nippon Professional Baseball League in Japan.

Cincinnati Reds

Arizona Diamondbacks
During the 2002–03 offseason, Dessens was involved in a four-team trade that sent him to the Arizona Diamondbacks.

Los Angeles Dodgers
Dessens stayed with the Diamondbacks until August , when the Los Angeles Dodgers acquired him for a minor leaguer to bolster their bullpen for the stretch run. That October, Dessens pitched in the postseason for the first and, to date, last time, appearing in one game during the Dodgers' Division Series loss to the St. Louis Cardinals.

Dessens pitched one more season for the Dodgers, then became a free agent in the offseason.

Kansas City Royals
Prior to the 2006 season, Dessens signed with the Kansas City Royals.

Second Stint with Dodgers
In July, the Dodgers reacquired Dessens from the Royals for pitcher Odalis Pérez and two minor leaguers, again to bolster their bullpen. While the Dodgers did win the wild card that season, Dessens did not appear as the Dodgers were swept in the Division Series to the New York Mets.

Milwaukee Brewers
In March 2007, Dessens was traded from the Dodgers to the Milwaukee Brewers for reserve outfielder Brady Clark and cash.

Colorado Rockies
In early August he was released by the Brewers, but a few days later he signed a minor league deal with the Colorado Rockies. He started 5 games for the Rockies, going 1–1 with a 7.58 ERA. He became a free agent at the end of the season.

Second Stint with Pirates
In January 2008, Dessens signed a minor league contract with the Pittsburgh Pirates, but was released during spring training.

Diablos Rojos del Mexico
He then spent most of the 2008 season in the Mexican League with the Diablos Rojos del México.

Atlanta Braves
After pitching (and winning) the final game of the league championship against the Sultanes de Monterrey, he signed a major league contract with the Atlanta Braves in  August.  After the season, Dessens again became a free agent.

New York Mets
In February , Dessens signed a minor league deal with the New York Mets.  Dessens made his Mets debut on June 23, 2009, against the St. Louis Cardinals. He was designated for assignment on July 30. He had his contract purchased on August 6, 2009, when Jon Niese was placed on the 60-day disabled list.

In December 2009, Dessens signed a minor league contract with the New York Mets for the 2010 season.

San Francisco Giants
On February 8, 2011, it was reported that Dessens had signed a minor league deal with the San Francisco Giants that included an invitation to spring training. However, on February 14, it was reported that the deal fell through.

Post Playing

He is currently an assistant pitching coach for the Arizona League Reds.

References

External links

1971 births
2006 World Baseball Classic players
2009 World Baseball Classic players
Arizona Diamondbacks players
Atlanta Braves players
Baseball players from Sonora
Buffalo Bisons (minor league) players
Carolina Mudcats players
Calgary Cannons players
Cincinnati Reds players
Colorado Rockies players
Colorado Springs Sky Sox players
Kansas City Royals players
Living people
Las Vegas 51s players
Los Angeles Dodgers players
Louisville RiverBats players
Major League Baseball pitchers
Major League Baseball players from Mexico
Mexican expatriate baseball players in Canada
Mexican expatriate baseball players in Japan
Mexican expatriate baseball players in the United States
Mexican people of German descent
Milwaukee Brewers players
Nashville Sounds players
New York Mets players
Sportspeople from Hermosillo
Pittsburgh Pirates players
Yomiuri Giants players